Serica is a genus from the group of May beetles and junebugs in the family Scarabaeidae.  There are at least 100 described species in Serica.

See also
 List of Serica species

References

Further reading

 
 
 

Melolonthinae